The discography of GNR (an acronym of "Grupo Novo Rock"), a Porto, Portuguese-based post-punk group, consists of ten studio albums, nine singles, one live albums, four extended plays and three compilation albums. This list does not include material performed by members or former members of GNR that was recorded with associated acts.

Albums

Studio

Live

Compilations

Extended plays

Singles

Other appearances

References
 

Discographies of Portuguese artists
Rock music group discographies